OutServe Magazine was a bi-monthly digital and print publication of OutServe, a non-profit, non-government organization for lesbian, gay, bisexual and transgender service members in the United States Armed Forces. It was co-founded by Air Force Staff Sgt. Jonathan Mills and Capt. Eddy Sweeney, and first published in March 2011, while OutServe was still operating clandestinely prior to the repeal of the "Don't Ask, Don't Tell" policy that banned open gays from service. The Magazine garnered over a quarter of a million views for its most popular issues. The publication was distributed free of charge on military bases, and was available to the public for downloading and redistribution through its website and mobile apps. It published 13 issues over 2 years, employing more than 30 volunteer staff, and was the first gay rights magazine to be approved for distribution on military bases.

History
In February 2011, OutServe, Inc. launched an initiative for a newsletter that would inform LGBT service members of the fast-growing support network that was available to them, as well as inform readers on the status of DADT and other LGBT-related policies. Jonathan Mills and Eddy Sweeney expanded on this idea and created a bi-monthly magazine that sought to publish relevant information in a pre-DADT repeal environment, inform LGBT service members of various resources available to them, provide a voice for LGBT stakeholders in the military, and begin to normalize open service by introducing the Armed Services to the gay military professional.

The first electronic-only issue of the Magazine, distributed in March 2011 to OutServe network members, as well as released to the press, had over 10,000 impressions within the first 48 hours, and was met with an overwhelming show of support from the public, the Department of Defense, and the Obama Administration. News organizations such as MSNBC, CNN, ABC, Der Spiegel, Stars and Stripes, and Military Times reached out to cover the launch. Writers and staff were originally attributed by pseudonyms in order to operate within the confines of DADT. In the months after, the bi-monthly publication shifted its focus from a pre-repeal environment to a post-repeal one, and the September 2011 Repeal Edition had a quarter of a million views.  This issue featured, for the first time in any publication, the faces of 101 actively serving LGBT military professionals.

The Magazine featured LGBT multimedia essays by artists such as JoAnn Santangelo and Jeff Sheng, published the first public interview with Joint Chiefs of Staff Adm. Michael Mullen after his retirement (the most senior military leader charged with implementation of DADT repeal), was cited regularly by major news outlets, and partnered with more than 15 advertisers, including CIA, Barefoot Wine, Rhino Africa, MetLife, Amazon, Absolut, Miller Lite, VisitPhilly, Wells Fargo, Human Right Campaign, and Orbitz. From its launch in 2011 to its one-year anniversary in March 2012, OutServe Magazine expanded its staff from 3 to more than 30 volunteers, added a new OutServe Blog, released Android, Windows Phone, and Apple mobile apps, and expanded print and web distribution from 10,000 readers in the first month to over a quarter of a million views in 2013.

OutServe Magazine published its final issue in June 2013, under the direction of its final Editor-in-Chief Angelina Leger, one month before OutServe-SLDN's reorganization and the accompanying resignation of several of its leaders.

Archived issues can accessed at MagCloud.

Repeal Edition
In September 2011, its third edition, the "Repeal Edition", revealed the identity of OutServe Co-director JD Smithas a U.S. Air Force active-duty lieutenant. The "Repeal Edition" featured 101 service members coming out to the public for the first time. It was also the first edition approved for distribution in print to military installations.

References

External links
 OutServe

Bimonthly magazines published in the United States
LGBT-related magazines published in the United States
Magazines established in 2011
Magazines disestablished in 2013
Magazines published in Washington, D.C.
Military magazines published in the United States
LGBT and military-related mass media
Defunct magazines published in the United States